Carlo di Giovanni Rossi (Karl Ivanovich Rossi; ;  – ) was an Italian architect who worked in Imperial Russia. He was the author of many classical buildings and architectural ensembles in Saint Petersburg and its environs.

Biography
Carlo Rossi was born  in Naples (his stepfather was the famous ballet artist Charles le Picq) and was brought to Russia in his childhood when his mother Guertroude Rossi-Le Picq, a well-known ballerina, was invited into Russia to perform. From youth he was connected with the world of the arts. He trained in the studio of architect Vincenzo Brenna. In 1795 he entered the service of the admiralty board of architecture; as the assistant to Brenna, together with whom, it is assumed, he participated in the construction of Saint Michael's Castle in Saint Petersburg.
From 1802 to 1803 Rossi studied in Italy. In 1806 he obtained the title of architect and an office. In 1808 he was dispatched to the Kremlin archaeological expedition in Moscow, where he built St. Catherine's Church of the Ascension Convent and the theater at Arbat Square, which burned to the ground during Napoleon's invasion of Russia. He was rewarded with the Order of St. Vladimir of IV degree. In 1814, he obtained the rank of Collegiate Councilor. In 1815, he returned to Saint Petersburg. In 1816, he was appointed to a position on the committee of structures and hydraulic works.

The buildings of Rossi are characteristic of the empire style, which combines grandeur with noble simplicity. These include: the Yelagin Palace with the hothouse and the pavilions (1816-1818), the Mikhailovsky Palace, General Staff Building, the buildings of the Senate and Synod (1829-1833), the façade of the Russian National Library that faces Alexandrinskaya Square, the pavilions of Anichkov Palace, the arch of the General Staff Building, the Alexandrine Theatre and the buildings of the Board of Theaters and Ministry of Internal Affairs. In Pavlovsk, Rossi built the palace library. One of the last buildings of Rossi was the belfry of the Yurevskogo monastery near Velikiy Novgorod.

On , he died of cholera in Saint Petersburg, according to available data - in complete oblivion and in poverty. His children were left with the responsibilities of his burial and debts, which they petitioned the Tsar for help with. The Tsar gave a small sum for the funeral and Rossi was buried in the Volkov Lutheran cemetery. During the Soviet period, he was reburied at the Lazarevskoe Cemetery of the Alexander Nevsky Monastery under the same tombstone.

Works
The Mikhailovsky Palace and adjacent buildings
The Alexandrinsky Theater and adjacent buildings
The Rossi Street buildings, including 2 Rossi Street
The General Staff building
The Senate and Synod Buildings
A pavilion at Sobieski's Castle in Oława
"Coffee House" pavilion in the Summer Garden
Rossi Pavilion and Rossi Bridge in the Mikhailovsky Garden
Pavilions in the garden of Anichkov Palace
St. Catherine Church of the Ascension Convent and Nikolskaya Tower in Kremlin
Military Gallery of the Winter Palace
Yelagin Palace
The façade of the Russian National Library, which faces Alexandrinskaya Square.
St. Peter and St. Paul's Cathedral, Tallinn

Honours and awards
 Order of St. Vladimir, 3rd class
 Order of St. Anna, 2nd class with diamonds

External links
 

1775 births
1849 deaths
Architects from Naples
Italian neoclassical architects
Italian emigrants to the Russian Empire
Russian neoclassical architects
Italian expatriates in Russia
Culture in Saint Petersburg
19th century in Saint Petersburg
Recipients of the Order of St. Vladimir, 3rd class
Recipients of the Order of St. Anna, 2nd class
Burials at Lazarevskoe Cemetery (Saint Petersburg)